Solwezi is a town in Zambia. It is the provincial capital of the mineral-rich  North-Western Province. Solwezi is also the administrative capital of Solwezi District, one of the eleven districts in the North-Western Province.

Location
The geographical coordinates of the city are:12°08'36.0"S, 26°23'09.0"E (Latitude:-12.143333; Longitude:26.385833).

It is located next to the Kifubwa River, with inscriptions dating from the Paleolithic period, carbon dated to about 6300 BC.

Population
In 1990, the population of Solwezi was 23,435 people. In 2000, there were 38,121 people. The 2010 population census and household survey enumerated the population of the town at 90,856 inhabitants.

Economy
Solwezi is a mining town. As of 2015, the town was still  developing, with infrastructure development running behind the swelling population. At that time, only the main street, Independence Road was named. Many of the other streets were un-named and unpaved. Copper is the main mineral extracted although cobalt, gold and uranium is also mined in the area.

Kalumbila is operated by First Quantum Minerals. The deposits at Lumwana were discovered in 1961, but no serious work was carried out there until Equinox Minerals Limited became involved in 1999. Uranium is also mined in Kalumbila District at the Lumwana mine. Kansanshi Mine exploits copper-gold ore. The mining site has intermittently been running since the early 20th century for copper and gold.

Tribes 
Kaonde is the largest tribe represented in Solwezi, in addition to large numbers of Lunda and Luvale speaking people. The Kaonde is a tribe that, like the Lunda people, are descendants of the Luba-Lunda Empire of Congo.  They were among the first Zambians to do mining of copper in Zambia as suggested by archaeological evidence at the Kansanshi Mine in Solwezi that dates back to the Iron Age. The Kaonde tribe falls under one of the main tribes of Zambia, among the Lozi, the Bemba, the Ngoni, the Tonga and the Luvale.  The Kaonde tribe has about 300,000 people in Zambia and about 30,000 people in Southern DRC.

Transportation 
Solwezi is situated on the T5 Motorway, which connects the Copperbelt Province with Angola. Most people walk or drive around the town to get to and from different places. The Solwezi Airport is an airport near the T5 motorway.

References

External links
 Zambian 2006 to 2010 Constituency and Ward Boundaries

 
Solwezi District
Provincial capitals in Zambia
Populated places in North-Western Province, Zambia